McCall Elementary School may refer to:
 George A. McCall School in Philadelphia
 Tom McCall Elementary School - Redmond School District - Redmond, Oregon
 Patricia Dean Boswell McCall Elementary School - Aledo Independent School District - Willow Park, Texas
 David McCall Elementary School - Plano Independent School District - Plano, Texas